Peter J. Levine (born October 20, 1960) is an American software executive and venture capitalist.

Early life
Levine was born in New York City and grew up in Peekskill, attending Hendrick Hudson High School. While attending summer camp in the Adirondack Mountains, he gained a lifelong passion for leadership  and the outdoors. Levine earned a BS in engineering from Boston University in 1983, and worked as a software engineer on Project Athena at MIT, while attending the MIT Sloan School of Management in 1988 and 1989.

Business career
From 1990 through 2001 he was an early employee of Veritas Software, beginning his career as a software engineer and ending as an executive vice president. Levine was a general partner at Mayfield Fund from 2002 through 2005, prior to becoming president and CEO of Xensource in February 2006.
After working to grow the company's business, Xensource was acquired by Citrix in 2007 for $500 million, with Levine being named a vice president of Citrix.

Levine taught marketing and sales at the Sloan School of Management in 2010 and 2011, and at the Stanford Graduate School of Business starting in 2012.
In March 2011, Levine became a partner at the Silicon Valley venture capital firm Andreessen Horowitz, leading the firm's investments in enterprise software including data center technology, enterprise applications and mobile computing. Levine has led the firm's investments at GitHub (acquired by MSFT in 2018 for $7.5B), Figma (Announced acquisition of $20B by Adobe), DigitalOcean (DOCN, IPO 2021), Mixpanel, ShieldAI, Apollo GraphQL, PlanetScale, and a number of other software companies. He became a member of the board of trustees of the National Outdoor Leadership School in 2013 for a term through 2019.

Philanthropy
A lifelong mountain climber, Levine has scaled some major worldwide routes, while using his passion for the environment and education to support many institutions, including Stanford University Development; Boston University; MIT; NOLS; The Adirondack Scholarship Foundation; and The Honnold Foundation, where he currently works alongside Alex Honnold, founding the Levine Impact Lab, which supports the growth and management of environmentally focused nonprofits.

References

Living people
American computer businesspeople
Boston University College of Engineering alumni
American venture capitalists
Place of birth missing (living people)
American company founders
MIT Sloan School of Management faculty
MIT Sloan School of Management alumni
American Jews
Andreessen Horowitz
1960 births